Aya Hijazi (also: Hegazy, Higazi) is an Egyptian-American charity worker and social activist. Together with her husband she founded an NGO "Belady Foundation" to support child political prisoners in Egypt. Hijazi, her husband and five other Belady members were imprisoned in Cairo from 2014 until 2017, when the Cairo Criminal Court found them innocent.

Childhood and education
Hijazi became interested in social activism during her childhood in the United States (US). She studied conflict analysis and conflict resolution at George Mason University in the US and law at Cairo University in Egypt.

2011 Egyptian revolution and Belady
During the 2011 Egyptian revolution, Hijazi returned to her homeland, Egypt, along with her husband, Mohamed Hassanein, to establish a non-governmental organization (NGO), "Belady" (meaning "My Home"). Hijazi and Hassanein's intention was that Belady was to become "a symbolic island that unified people from all walks of life, allowing them to work towards the betterment of society". Belady focused on children and youth – one of Belady's main projects was helping street children who would otherwise be unsupported by state or non-state social support institutions. Working on such projects was seen by Belady to foster a sense of community while developing life skills within the children and the volunteers.

Arrest and Imprisonment
On May 1, 2014, police forces raided Belady and arrested Aya, her husband, Mohamed, Sherif Talaat and Amira Farag, also Belady members. They were charged with child abuse. Three months later, the police arrested Ibrahim Abd Rabbo, Karim Magdy and Mohamed al-Sayed, who had been trying to film video testimony with several children who had earlier been interviewed by the prosecution. For nearly three years, the seven individuals were imprisoned under charges that included human trafficking, kidnapping, and rape.

NGOs and public figures from Egypt and around the world pressed for the release of Aya, her husband, and the Belady members. The case took a turning point when Aya's college friend, Chelsea Cowan, successfully lobbied congressmen and senators, bringing attention to her case. As a result, Hillary Clinton made it a highlight in her presidential election campaign and President Trump pressed for the release of Aya and the other defendants.

On April 16, 2017, the Cairo Criminal Court found Aya and all Belady members innocent of all charges. Two days after their release, Dina Powell (U.S. Deputy National Security Advisor for Strategy to President Donald Trump) flew with Aya and her husband in a private plane to the United States; President Trump, along with his daughter, Ivanka, and her husband, Jared Kushner, welcomed her to the White House and celebrated her release.  According to Hijazi, Trump told her at that meeting "You know it's I who released you, don't you? I succeeded and Obama failed," a sentiment that she felt exposed egotistical motives, and contributed to her endorsing Joe Biden in the 2020 presidential election.

Aya's case took place in the context of Egypt's crackdown on civil society, police corruption, the fabrication of criminal cases, and the abuse of pretrial detention and its use as a political tool to suppress any opposition.

Post Release
, Aya resides in Washington D.C., where she works on expanding Belady and "saving the dreams of the most vulnerable children", by working towards the release of child political prisoners in Egypt. She plans to establish "islands of humanity" throughout the Middle East and other conflict zones. Hijazi initially supported Bernie Sanders for president in the 2020 election. In early November 2020, Hijazi tweeted her support for Joe Biden.

Personal life
Hijazi was born to an Egyptian mother and Lebanese father. She married another Egyptian–American social activist, Mohamed Hassanien.

References

External links
 
 

American people imprisoned abroad
Women humanitarians
Living people
1987 births
Egyptian activists
Lebanese people of Egyptian descent
George Mason University alumni
American people of Egyptian descent
American people of Lebanese descent
Egyptian people of Lebanese descent
Egyptian women activists
American Muslims
Harvard Kennedy School alumni